Hörður Barðdal (Hordur Barddal) (22 May 1946 in Reykjavík – 4 August 2009) was a competitive water polo player, competitive swimmer, competitive skier, competitive golfer, and a disabled athlete activist. His parents were Óli S. Barðdal, director of Seglagerðin Ægir, and Sesselja Guðnadóttir Barðdal. Óli died in 1983 but Sesselja outlives her son.

At the age of nine, Hörður contracted polio, yet he never let his paralysis stop him at either work or play. His athletic achievements and his pioneering work within the sports arena speak of diligence, fighting spirit and positivity that inspired others in the same position with courage and eagerness to stand at an equal footing with able people.

During the years 1965–1970, Hörður played water polo with able athletes with Reykjavík F.C (KR) and he won the Reykjavík and Icelandic Championships several times in that area of sports. He was also a coach at the Reykjavík F.C. for a while, where he trained both able and disabled people in swimming. He was one of the first competitive athletes in the Reykjavík's Sport Union for the Disabled (ÍFR) and he competed among other places at the Nordic Championships for the Disabled in 1976 and 1977 in swimming, where he won a bronze and silver medal. He was awarded the first Disabled Athlete of the Year in 1977, and he concluded his swimming career at the 1980 Summer Paralympics in Arnhem, Netherlands.

Hörður was one of the founders of the Icelandic Sports Associations for the Disabled (ÍF) and was a member of the board of the Association until 1986. Hörður was often a team manager at large sport events, for instance at the 1994 Winter Paralympics in Lillehammer; he was an integral player in the launch of winter sports for the disabled in Iceland. He received the gold award from the Icelandic Sports Association for the Disabled in the year 1994 for his efforts to promote sports among the disabled.

During the last years, it was golf that totally captured Hörður's heart, and he carried out groundbreaking work in enhancing disabled people's appreciation of the sport. He founded the Icelandic Disabled Golf Association (GSFÍ), in collaboration with the Icelandic Golf Association (GSÍ), and was the president of the board until his untimely death in 2009. He was also a board member of the European Disabled Golf Association (EDGA), who decided, in the fall 2010, to commission a trophy in his memory, "The Hordur Barddal Trophy", which has been awarded since in both male and female categories.

Hörður married Bergþóra Sigurbjörnsdóttir in the year 1968 but their ways parted. They had three daughters together: Jóhanna Ingileif, Sesselja Engilráð and Bergþóra Fanney Barðdal. He then married Soffía Kristín Hjartardóttir in the year 1980. Soffía died in 2007. Hörður's stepson from his marriage with Soffía is Þórður Vilberg Oddsson. The grandchildren are nine in total.

The Hörður Barðdal's Memorial Fund for Disabled Golfers was founded in the summer 2011 by Hörður's mother, his three daughters, Kristmann Magnússon, director of Pfaff in Iceland, the Icelandic Sports Association for the Disabled, and the Icelandic Golf Association.

References

External links
 The Hörður Barðdal’s Memorial Fund for Disabled Golfers

1946 births
2009 deaths
Hordur Barddal
Hordur Barddal
Parasports competitors
People with polio
Hordur Barddal
Hordur Barddal
Hordur Barddal
Hordur Barddal
Hordur Barddal